Freddy Vargas Castellanos (born October 11, 1982 in Mucuchíes) is a Venezuelan road cyclist.

Career

2002
1st Overall Vuelta al Táchira  
1st Stage 4
2003
1st Stage 7 Vuelta al Táchira
1st  Young rider Classification Vuelta a Venezuela
2005
1st Stage 3 Tour de la Guadeloupe
2007
1st Stage 7 Vuelta al Táchira
1st Overall Clásico Virgen de la Consolación de Táriba
1st Stage 3 Clasico Ciclistico Banfoandes
2008
1st Stage 5 Vuelta a Trujillo
3rd Overall Vuelta a Venezuela  
2009
1st Stage 3 Vuelta a Trujillo 
2012
1st Stage 5 Vuelta al Táchira

References
 

1982 births
Living people
Venezuelan male cyclists
Tour de Guadeloupe stage winners
People from Mérida (state)